Foursome is an American romantic comedy streaming television series starring Jenn McAllister and an ensemble cast of other social media entertainers and professional actors. The series was produced by AwesomenessTV and premiered on March 30, 2016 on YouTube Premium. The series lasted 4 seasons before getting axed on May 27th, 2019

Plot
Andie (Jenn McAllister) is a sophomore in high school in San Bernardino who has trouble with dating, because her older brother Alec (Logan Paul) does not want her to date anyone. Andie's three best high school friends: Dakota, a high school senior, Tiffany, Alec's girlfriend/college student and Imogen, Andie's homeschooled neighbors decide to help Andie with her dating problems, so Andie can freely go on dates without her brother stepping in to try and stop her.

Cast
 Jenn McAllister as Andie Fixler
 Meghan Falcone as Courtney Todd (seasons 1–3; guest starring, season 4)
 Rickey Thompson as Dakota Green
 Brooke Markham as Imogen Hillenshine (seasons 1–2)
 Logan Paul as Alec Fixler (seasons 1–3)
 Cameron Moulène as Josh Bennett
 Rahart Adams as Kent Saydak (season 2–present)
 Madeline Whitby as Greer Ashton (main, season 2–present; recurring, season 1)
 Sarah Yarkin as Peg (season 3)
 Monica Sherer as Mae (main, season 3–present; recurring, seasons 1–2)
 John Milhiser as Mr. Shaw (main, season 3–present; recurring, seasons 1–2)
 Jared Wernick as Divit (season 3)
 Tucker Albrizzi as Terry (season 3)
 James Morosini as Hugh (season 4)
 Sarah Gilman as Wynn (season 4)
 Jesse Leigh as Rubin (season 4)

Production

Development
In October 2015, YouTube announced YouTube Red, its paid subscription ad service that would offer subscribers an ad-free experience, which would also allow users to download videos for offline viewing. In addition, the service would be launching original content exclusive to YouTube Red subscribers in 2016.

On June 23, 2016, YouTube announced that "Foursome" was renewed for a second season. The first two episodes of the second season aired on December 6, 2016.

On May 1, 2017, AwesomenessTV announced that "Foursome" was renewed for a third season. The entire season was released on November 1, 2017. Logan Paul was removed from the upcoming fourth season on January 10, 2018 in the wake of a video Paul uploaded that attracted widespread criticism. The Alec Fixler role was completely written out without a replacement actor.

Due to the extreme backlash Logan Paul's controversial Youtube video, viewership for the took a deep dive, resulting in low ratings which eventually resulted in the show getting axed on May 27th,2019.

Episodes

Season 1 (2016)
With their father being gone,Andie has a tough time adjusting to her Sophomore year of high school when her popular but extremely overprotective brother watches her every move.

Season 2 (2016–17)
Three weeks have passed since the college party, and it's new semester which means New Andie who tries to find her way through the difficult world of high school as a single women.

Season 3 (2017)
2 months has passed since the events of Homecoming Night, Brayer High has hit a major slump. With Imogen gone, the remaining foursome decide to vacation in a private resort island, that unfortunately has a bunch of strict rules that they are willing to break

Season 4 (2018)
Andie and Josh are finally together, but it soon comes crashing down as Andie realizes that she only has one summer to spend with the rest of her friends and her boyfriend before they head off to college and she is stuck at Brayer as a Junior year

References

External links
 Series playlist on YouTube

Awesomeness (company)
2016 American television series debuts
2018 American television series endings
2010s American comedy-drama television series
2010s American high school television series
2010s American teen drama television series
English-language television shows
Television series about teenagers
YouTube Premium original series